Brother of the Year is a 2018 Thai romantic comedy film co-written and directed by Witthaya Thongyooyong, produced by Jor Kwang Films, and distributed by GDH 559. The film stars Sunny Suwanmethanont, Urassaya Sperbund, and Nichkhun. The film, which depicts a sibling rivalry, was a commercial hit in Thailand, grossing  during its four-day opening weekend.

Cast
 Sunny Suwanmethanont as Chut
 Urassaya Sperbund as Jane
 Nichkhun as Moji
 Manasaporn Chanchalerm as Dear

References

External links 
 

2018 films
Thai-language films
Thai romantic comedy films
2010s Thai films
GDH 559 films
2018 romantic comedy films